"I Turn to You" is a song written by Max D. Barnes and Curly Putman, and recorded by American country music singer George Jones.  It was released in May 1987 as the third single from the album Wine Colored Roses.  It heralded a downturn for the singer on the country charts, failing to make the Top 25, and reflected the changes taking place in country music at the time as the "new traditionalist" movement, with younger country artists like Randy Travis, dominating radio airplay.

From 1993 to 2013, "I Turn to You" was chosen for re-release on four additional compilation albums by Sony Music Distribution, Madacity and IMG.

Chart performance

References 

1986 songs
Songs written by Max D. Barnes
Songs written by Curly Putman
Song recordings produced by Billy Sherrill
George Jones songs
Epic Records singles